David Low Dodge (June 14, 1774April 23, 1852) was an American activist and theologian who helped to establish the New York Peace Society and was a founder of the New York Bible Society and the New York Tract Society. According to historian Dale R. Steiner, he wrote "some of the earliest and most effective antiwar literature in the United States."

Life and career 
David Low Dodge was born in Brooklyn, Connecticut on June 14, 1774. His parents were David Dodge and Mary (Stuart) Earl.   She was said to have been the daughter of a Scottish nobleman, perhaps connected with the House of Stuart, pretenders to the British throne, although this has never been confirmed.  She had previously been married to William Earl who died of yellow fever fighting for the British during an attack on Havana in 1762.    During the War of Independence, Mary's two children from this first marriage, William and Jesse Earl, were both killed on active service.  Dodge later wrote that "these events almost destroyed my mother's nervous system."

From the age of seven to fourteen, except two months of district school in winter, Dodge was working on a farm in Hampton, Connecticut.  He was a teacher at the age of nineteen, first in community schools then in private ones. He later began selling dry goods in Hartford, Connecticut. He also managed the first cotton factory built in Connecticut, near the town of Norwich. In the early 19th century he relocated to New York City.

On June 7, 1798, he married Sarah Cleveland (1780–1862), the daughter of Rev. Aaron Cleveland (1744–1815) and Abiah Hyde (c1750–1788). They had seven children including William E. Dodge and Elizabeth Clementine Stedman. He was also the great-grandfather of Grace Hoadley Dodge. Sarah Cleveland was great-aunt of Grover Cleveland 22nd and 24th President of the United States.

He died on April 23, 1852 in New York City.

Peace activism
David Low Dodge is credited with publishing the first pamphlets in America that expressed the futility of war. The Mediator's Kingdom not of this World, was published in 1809; his second, War Inconsistent with the Religion of Jesus Christ, was completed in 1812, two years before the publication of Noah Worcester's Solemn Review of the Custom of War—a work that has since overshadowed Dodge's contribution. 

Dodge considered forming the first peace society in 1812, but the timing was inappropriate due to the war with Great Britain. However, in August 1815 the New York Peace Society was formed with Dodge as the president. This was the first in the world—four months before Noah Worcester formed the Massachusetts Peace Society (December 26, 1815), and a year before the English Peace society was formed (June 14, 1816). In 1829 he assisted in organizing the new national society, and presided at its first annual meeting. He was a member of the board of directors, and later a life director, maintaining his connection with the society until his death.

Founded organizations 
New York Peace Society (August 1815)
New York Tract Society
New York Bible Society

Notes

Notable publications 

'' Originally published in 1812.

References

External links 
 
 

1774 births
1852 deaths
Activists from New York City
American anti-war activists
American theologians
American people of English descent
American people of Scottish descent
American people of Welsh descent
Dodge family
People from Brooklyn, Connecticut
People from Hartford, Connecticut